Maestro is a single/extended play (EP) by the Norwegian rock band Kaizers Orchestra. It was released on 1 August 2005 by Kaizerecords.

Track listing
"Maestro"
"På ditt skift"
"D-Dagen"
"Sorti"

"D-Dagen" and "Sorti" are non-album tracks.

2005 EPs